The Wisconsin International Raceway (abbreviated WIR) is an asphalt stock car racing oval and dragstrip in the Town of Buchanan, in Outagamie County, just outside Kaukauna, Wisconsin, USA.

History 
Wisconsin International Raceway originally opened as KK Sports Arena, a nod to its location on County Trunk Highway KK, and opened its maiden season on May 30, 1964, with a single quarter-mile oval dirt track. A half mile D-shaped dirt track was inaugurated on August 1, 1965 with motorcycle races, by which time a figure-8 dirt track had been established inside the quarter-mile oval. Its paved drag strip opened on June 5, 1966. The half mile track was paved in 1968.

The name of the racing complex was changed to Wisconsin International Raceway on March 9, 1971.

Oval track

There are six divisions at the track. The Super Late Model and Late Model divisions race on the half-mile track. The Super Stocks, Sport 4's (stock four cylinders modified for racing), and Wisconsin Sport Trucks divisions race on the quarter-mile track.  The Figure 8 cars end programs on the Figure 8 track inside of the quarter-mile. An automated timing and scoring system was set up for the 2007 season, and each race car carries a transponder.

The Fox River Racing Club began helping promote the weekly events in 1975.

Special events

The track had an annual American Speed Association event when the sanctioning body was in existence. The track resumed hosting ASA events after the series was reorganized, and it held an event in 2007 for the ASA Midwest Tour. That event, the Dixieland 250, is now part of the ARCA Midwest Tour schedule and is one of the most prestigious events on the calendar, attracting NASCAR champions Kevin Harvick and Ron Hornaday Jr. in 2009 and Kyle Busch in 2017. The race was part of the NASCAR Midwest Series between 1998 and 2004 and had 13 races under NASCAR banner. Earlier the USAC Stock Car series had raced at the track.

The track has hosted an annual Red, White, and Blue State Championship Series for super late models since 1972. The series consist of three races in June (red), July (white), and August (blue). The series changed from Saturday nights to Thursday nights to combine with the weekly series in 2009. The series was part of the Midwest Challenge Series (formerly ARTGO) and later part of the Wisconsin Challenge Series. 7,832 people watched Dick Trickle win the first red race.

ASA National Tour ran a race at the facility in 2002. The race was won by Kevin Cywinski.

Notable drivers

All drivers listed later competed in NASCAR nationally-sanctioned events

Lowell Bennett (1991, 1998 and 2012 track champion, 1999, 2004, 2009, and 2010, 2012. Five Red, White & Blue championships )
Rich Bickle
Scott Hansen (1985–89 track champion)
Matt Kenseth (1994 and 1995 track champion)
Todd Kluever
Alan Kulwicki (1979 and 1980 track champion)
Doug Mahlik
Ty Majeski
Dave Marcis
Mark Martin (Red, White, and Blue champion)
Ted Musgrave
Robbie Reiser
Jim Sauter (1981 track champion)
Tim Sauter
Johnny Sauter
Jason Schuler
Dick Trickle (seven Red, White, and Blue championships)
Dave Watson (two Red, White, and Blue championships)

Trickle carved enough of a legacy that the track dedicated the Dick Trickle Pavilion in Turn 2. Joe Shear won the Red, White, and Blue series 1979, 1987, and 1988.

Track champions

Dragstrip

The dragstrip is a 1/4 mile paved track. It is one of three operating dragstrips in Wisconsin.

Weekly divisions
There are six weekly divisions that compete on Saturday nights: Top Eliminator Class, Hot Rod Eliminator, Street Eliminator, Pro-Bike and Snowmobile, Street Bike, and Junior Dragsters.

Eve of Destruction
The track has hosted an annual "Eve of Destruction" each September since 1993 and it is the track's annual season finale for the oval track. The Eve of Destruction is one of the biggest events hosted at track, as the 10,000 seat raceway is generally packed. Drivers compete in a variety of unusual events such as chain races (two cars are chained together),  spin to win (race backwards and then spin around forward for the finish), trailer races (part of the trailer must remain intact to continue racing), etc. In between races, fans are entertained by stunt car drivers. Ten school buses compete in a survival-of-the-fittest competition, where the last bus standing wins. Track owner Roger Van Daalwyk described the Eve of Destruction: "We kind of wreck everything." During the 2017 Eve of Destruction, a local driver died from injuries sustained in a figure-eight race.

Media

Further reading 
 Wisconsin International Raceway: Where the Big Ones Run!, Joe Verdegan. M&B Global Solutions, November 30, 2016, .

References

External links

Official website
Wisconsin International Raceway race results at Racing-Reference
Fox River Racing club official website
Wisconsin Sport Truck division website
Article on the Red, White, and Blue state championship series beginnings, accessed August 2006

IHRA drag racing venues
NASCAR tracks
Motorsport venues in Wisconsin
Buildings and structures in Outagamie County, Wisconsin
Tourist attractions in Outagamie County, Wisconsin
Articles containing video clips